The 2013 Deutsche Tourenwagen Masters was the twenty-seventh season of premier German touring car championship and also fourteenth season under the moniker of Deutsche Tourenwagen Masters since the series' resumption in 2000.

Bruno Spengler started the season as the defending drivers' champion. BMW was the defending manufacturers' champion, and BMW Team Schnitzer the defending teams' champion. Mike Rockenfeller clinched his first DTM title at the penultimate round of the season at Zandvoort, driving for Audi.

This was the first season since 2005 without any female DTM drivers after Susie Wolff and Rahel Frey left at the end of the 2012 season.

Calendar
A provisional eleven-round calendar was announced on 23 October 2012, and the final schedule was published on 21 November 2012. To accommodate the change of date, the Zandvoort meeting was moved from July to September, and would become the penultimate event of the season, with the Oschersleben and second Hockenheim meetings also being held later than originally scheduled.

Results summary

Calendar changes
 The 2013 season saw the DTM series travel to Russia for the first time, with the inclusion of a round at the Moscow Raceway scheduled for August.
 The non-championship exhibition rounds held at the Munich Olympic Stadium in 2011 and 2012 was discontinued in 2013.
 The race at the Circuit Ricardo Tormo in Spain – which had been included on the DTM calendar in 2011 and 2012 – was discontinued.

Teams and drivers
The following manufacturers, teams and drivers competed in the 2013 Deutsche Tourenwagen Masters. All teams competed with tyres supplied by Hankook.

Team changes
 After competing with six cars in 2012, BMW increased its involvement in the series by expanding to eight cars. Team MTEK ran the new team for the marque.
 Mercedes-Benz initially submitted eight entries to the grid, but later scaled back their commitment to six cars after parting company with Persson Motorsport.

Driver changes
 David Coulthard left DTM after three seasons racing for Mercedes-Benz in order to continue his role as commentator of Formula One races for the BBC.
 Rahel Frey, who drove for Audi in 2011 and 2012, left the series and joined Audi's GT programme.
 Timo Glock left Formula One to join the DTM series, driving for BMW. Glock joined Team MTEK, BMW's fourth team.
 Jamie Green left Mercedes-Benz after eight seasons with the manufacturer to join Audi.
 Joey Hand and Andy Priaulx swapped seats, with Hand moving from Team RMG to join Team RBM, with Priaulx going in the opposite direction, moving from Team RBM to Team RMG.
 Formula 3 Euro Series front-runners Daniel Juncadella and Pascal Wehrlein joined the DTM series, driving for Mücke Motorsport.
 Having originally been announced as one of the six Mercedes drivers for the 2013 season, Ralf Schumacher announced his retirement from motor racing on 15 March 2013.
 BMW test driver Marco Wittmann was promoted to a race seat for the 2013 season, racing for Team MTEK.
 Susie Wolff ended her DTM career after seven seasons with Mercedes-Benz to focus solely on Williams F1 testing duties.

Rule changes

Technical
For the first time that all-DTM cars introduced the F1-style Drag Reduction Systems (DRS) to adjust the rear wing and assist overtaking with rear wing inclination angle to 15°.
The softer option tyre were introduced to improve spectacle and more degradable as well as pit stop window allocation tweaked.

Results and standings

Results summary

Notes

Championship standings
Scoring system
Points are awarded to the top ten classified finishers as follows:

Drivers' championship

† — Driver retired, but was classified as they completed 75% of the winner's race distance.

Teams' championship

Manufacturers' championship

References

External links
 The official website of the Deutsche Tourenwagen Masters (English)

Deutsche Tourenwagen Masters seasons
Deutsche Tourenwagen Masters